The Church of the Visitation (formerly Abbey Church of St John in the Woods) is a Catholic church in Ein Karem, Jerusalem, and honors the visit paid by the Virgin Mary, the mother of Jesus, to Elizabeth, the mother of John the Baptist. This is the site where tradition says that Mary recited her song of praise, the Magnificat, one of the most ancient Marian hymns.

Tradition
The Bible doesn't mention the birth place of John, it only states that Mary went to "a town in the hill country of Judea" (Luke 1:39). One tradition attributes the construction of the first church of Ein Karem to Empress Helena of Constantinople, Constantine I's mother, who identified the site as the home of John's father, Zachary.

Archaeology
Bellarmino Bagatti excavated the site in 1938.

Byzantine period
Archaeologists found a Byzantine cistern in the courtyard and, more significantly, the remains of a Byzantine chapel over which the later churches were erected.

Crusader period
From the Crusader conquest of the Holy Land onwards, three different locations in Ein Karem became connected with the life of St John the Baptist and turned into points of interest for pilgrims: a cave within the village, a site on a hill south of it, and the village's main water fountain. The events connected to the sites are the meeting between Mary and her cousin Elizabeth, the home of Zachary and Elizabeth, the birth of John, and the hiding place of Elizabeth and John. The Crusaders erected two main churches in Ein Karem, the precursors of what are today the Church of St John the Baptist and the Church of the Visitation. After the departure of the Crusaders, the different traditions shifted back and forth between the two locations. 
 
At the site of the Church of the Visitation, the Crusaders erected a two-story church dedicated to the meeting between Elizabeth and Mary over the ancient ruins they found here..

Ayyubid and Mamluk period
When the Crusaders were pushed out of the Holy Land, the church gradually deteriorated. In the 14th century it was for a while under the care of Armenian monks, but in 1480 Felix Fabri reports: "In this chapel there are broken altars and ruined vaults; on the walls are ancient paintings, and both at the upper and the lower building shrubs and grasses grow upon the vaults. . . . Once there was here a fine and stately church, and monks dwelt in cells beside it; but now alas! it has become the ruined house of one most miserable Saracen."

Ottoman period
The Franciscan Custody of the Holy Land bought the plot of land with the ruined Crusader complex from an Arab family in 1679.

Only in 1862 did the Franciscans begin reconstruction of the lower level of the church.

British Mandate period
In 1937 the Franciscans excavated the grounds. Design and construction of the upper level of the structure began in 1938, and was completed by Italian architect Antonio Barluzzi in 1955.

Description

Courtyard, exterior and annexes
The courtyard contains a statue of Mary and Elizabeth, and on the wall opposite the entrance to the lower church are forty-two ceramic tablets bearing the verses of the Magnificat in as many different languages. On the facade of the upper church is a striking mosaic commemorating the Visitation. Next to the church proper, a Crusader hall of the 12th century survived in good condition.

Lower church
The lower church contains a narrow medieval barrel-vaulted crypt ending with a well-head from which, according to tradition, Elizabeth and her infant drank. The well is connected to a Roman or Byzantine overflow pipe running under the medieval floor. Also preserved are remains of the ancient church and beautiful mosaic floors.

The rock with a cleft next to the entrance of the medieval crypt is said to mark the site where the mountain opened up to hide Elizabeth and the infant John from Herod's soldiers – this is the "Rock of Concealment". This tradition is based on the 2nd-century apocryphal Protoevangelium of James 22:3.

The interior of the lower church holds Italianate frescoes depicting Zachary at the altar of the Lord, the Visitation, and Elizabeth hiding her son during the Massacre of the Innocents.

Upper church
The walls of the upper church are decorated with frescoes. Those on the southern wall are depicting five episodes, from left (east) to right (west):
 the Council of Ephesus (431), which defined Mary as Theotokos or the Mother of God;
 Mary protecting Christians with her mantle, according to the oldest extant hymn to the Blessed Virgin Mary as Theotokos, the Sub tuum praesidium;
 the Wedding at Cana;
 the Battle of Lepanto (1571), in which a united Catholic fleet defeated an Ottoman fleet, a victory ascribed to the help of the Virgin Mary under the title Mary Help of Christians and celebrated by the Catholic Church with the feast of Our Lady of the Rosary;
 Duns Scotus, supported by the Franciscans, defending his thesis on the Immaculate Conception at the Sorbonne in Paris against the dissenting Dominicans.

Behind the altar, a fresco is showing Mary approaching through Judaea, with the Franciscan custos presenting her the model of the church and the Catholic patriarch of Jerusalem of the time in attendance.

Verses from the Magnificat are painted on the columns of the church. In the corners are the four cardinal virtues, and around the windows on the left side of the church are Christian writers (Fathers and Doctors of the Church) who have written about the Virgin Mary.  The ceiling is painted in the Tuscan style of the 14th century.

Gallery

References

Bibliography

External links

 The Franciscan Custody of the Holy Land
 Visitation Church, Biblewalks

Visit